The Mesaoria is a broad, sweeping plain which makes up the north centre of the island of Cyprus.

Geography
The Mesaoria is the name given to the broad tract of plain which extends across the island from the Bay of Famagusta in the east to that of Morphou in the west, which is a length of 96 km, with a breadth varying from 16 to 32 km.

The streams which traverse it are mere winter torrents, which descend from the southern chain but scarcely reach the sea. The Pedias (Pediaeus) and lalias (Yialias, Idalias) lose most of their flood
waters in the marshes about Salamis, near the Bay of Famagusta. The Pedias rises near
Machaira and passes close to Nicosia, indeed flowed through it before the river was diverted by the Venetians.  The lalias rises very near the source of the Pedias, passes through Nisou, Dali (the ancient Idalion) and Pyroi, and traverses the Mesaoria in a direction more or less parallel with the Pedias.  A smaller but more constant streams is the Cares (Clarios), which flows from the slopes of Troodos
into the Bay of Morphou.

The Mesaoria plain is bounded on the east and west by the Mediterranean Sea, on the south by the Troodos mountains and on the north by the Kyrenia mountains (Pentadaktylos). It has an area of approximately 1000 km² (390 mi²). It rises to an altitude of 325 m (1066 ft), with an average elevation of perhaps 100 m (330 ft). There are a number of rivers and other water courses crossing this plain, but none of them have water year round.

The Alluvial Plains of the centre of the island are for the most part the product of successive rain-storms and floods which have brought down from the mountains immense quantities of light debris which has been spread over the lower lands, principally by human agency exerted in the system of colmatage, which has been practised from time immemorial. This has resulted in the general raising of the land surface and incidentally in the natural reclamation of many acres of land in the lower parts of the Mesaoria, which once were arms of the sea.

The word "Mesaoria" (sometimes spelled "Mesarya"), means "between the mountains" in Greek. For the most part, the Mesaoria is a flat, bare plain, with few trees except for those planted as windbreaks. It is the agricultural heartland of Cyprus, but it depends completely on winter rainfall and irrigation for its water, which limits production. It is also the most settled region on the island, containing dozens of villages and many of the largest towns, including the capital, Nicosia.

Due to deforestation, much of the Mesaoria is covered with "Kafkalla", which is a local term referring to calcium carbonate that has been compacted into a hardpan. The only plants that grow well on this surface are quickly eaten by grazing animals, which has greatly exacerbated soil erosion.

The plain which has a subtropical semi-arid climate, can be uncomfortably hot in the summer, with temperatures of 40 °C being common. The rainfall on the plain is significantly lower than in the mountains, but in recent years a number of dams and irrigation systems have been constructed to capture the mountain runoff.

History
Twenty million years ago Cyprus was actually two islands, which were the predecessors of the Kyrenia and Troodos mountain ranges. Approximately one million years ago, the Mesaoria plain arose, resulting in the current island of Cyprus. At various times, changing levels of the Mediterranean sea covered and exposed the plain; it has been in its present form since the end of the Pleistocene.

The Mesaoria plain shows evidence of cultivation dating from the neolithic. In classical times the entire center of the island was covered by dense forests. Most of these were cut down in the middle of the 1st century BC to provide wood for the Ptolemaic navy. Additionally, much wood was harvested to provide energy for the extraction of copper. However, as recently as the late sixteenth century there were still significant stands of trees on the plain. Today, the only remaining forested areas are on the surrounding mountains, particularly the Troodos range.

As evidenced by a papal document in 1196, the eastern region of Mesaoria had become settled with a dense network of villages by the 12th century. The plain served as the island's prime agricultural region.

A single line of railway of 2 ft 6in gauge was constructed the full length of the plain, from Famagusta to Nicosia (36 miles) and then to Karavostasi, on the Bay of Morphou (a further 34 miles). Work was begun in 1904 and Nicosia the capital was connected on 21 October 1905. The line was closed in 1951.

See also
Mesara
Breadbasket

Notes

Landforms of Northern Cyprus
Plains of Cyprus